Religious democracy is a form of government where the values of a particular religion affect laws and rules. The term applies to all countries in which religion is incorporated into the form of government.

Democracies are characterized as secular or religious. The definition of democracy is disputed and interpreted differently amongst politicians and scholars. It could be argued if only liberal democracy is true democracy, if religion can be incorporated into democracy, or if religion is a necessity for democracy. The religiosity of political leaders can also have an effect on the practice of democracy.

Criticism 

Major criticism of religious democracy include criticism from the secular and the legalist points of view.

 From the secular point of view, religion is a hindrance to democracy as it enforces a set of legal and societal principles. Separation of religion and state is required to protect freedom and ensure equality. As many countries, including the United States incorporate religion into their legislation, it could be argued as to what constitutes a secular democracy.
 From the Legal point of view, democracy can never enjoy general acceptance in a religious society. Anything outside of rigid interpretation of religious texts is rejected and God rather than the people is sovereign.
 Conversion is a threat to diversity richness of a nation. It installs fear among the people of a particular community as they find their population shrinking due to conversion.

Examples 

Historical democracies with state sponsored religious laws:

 Athenian democracy (Ancient Greek religion)
 Roman Republic (Ancient Roman religion)
 Hindu s and Panchayati raj
 Buddhist s
 Icelandic Commonwealth (Norse paganism, after AD 1000 Christianity)
 Old Swiss Confederacy (Christianity)
 Nepal was once the world's only Hindu Kingdom during the monarch's rule but has ceased to be so following a declaration by the Parliament in 2006. The official religion of Nepal was Hinduism but in 2006 Nepal became democratic country and constitution declared it as a Secular state with freedom of religion is guaranteed by Constitution. During the rule of the Monarch, there was democratic rule, and for a brief time, a partyless religious democracy of the Panchayat (Nepal) system.

Contemporary democracies with state religions:

 Christian:
Armenia, Greece, Argentina, Costa Rica, Denmark, Norway, England
 Islamic:
 Bangladesh, Malaysia, Pakistan, Mauritania,Maldives, Morocco
 Buddhist:
 Bhutan, Sri Lanka
 Jewish:
 Israel

Contemporary states with state religions that claim to be democratic but are not recognised as such by the international community

 Islamic:
 Iran

See also 

 State religion
 Theodemocracy
 Basic Laws of Israel
 Christian democracy
 Clash of Civilizations
 Dialogue Among Civilizations
 Institute on Religion and Democracy
 Islamic democracy

References 

Types of democracy